The Voice of Ireland is an Irish reality talent show. The third series began airing on 5 January 2014 on RTÉ One. Kathryn Thomas presents the main show, while Eoghan McDermott co-presents. Bressie, Kian Egan and Jamelia returned as coaches while Dolores O'Riordan replaced Sharon Corr who left after the second series. The first episode aired on 5 January.
After the show Jamelia and Dolores quit and were replaced by Una Foden/Healy and Rachel Stevens
The Blind auditions took place on 18, 19 and 20 October at The Helix. An addition this season is that RTÉ 2fm have selected 5 wildcards to audition.

Cavan singer and guitarist Brendan McCahey was crowned the 2014 Voice of Ireland on 28 April 2014. He was victorious with his version and now single You Can't Judge a Book by the Cover.
He was coached by Bressie and performed with Jerry Fish in the final.

Teams

Color key

Blind Auditions
The Blind auditions took place on 18, 19 and 20 October at The Helix. The coaches choose teams of artists through a blind audition process. Each coach has the length of the artists' performance to decide if they want that artist on their team. Should two or more coaches want the same artist, then the artist gets to choose their coach. This series, each coach gets to pick ten artists to join their team. Once the coaches have picked their team, they are to pit them against each other in the ultimate sing off; The Battles. An addition this season is that RTÉ 2fm have selected 5 wildcards to audition.

Color key

Blind Auditions 1

Blind Auditions 2

Blind Auditions 3

Blind Auditions 4

Blind Auditions 5

Blind Auditions 6

RTÉ 2fm Wildcards
 Caoin Fitzpatrick
 Ciara Donnelly
 Áine Finlay
 Brendan McCahey
 Daragh Kiely

Battles
The Battle round took place on 15 and 16 December in The Helix. The coaches' mentors included UK singers Sarah Harding and Matt Cardle. There was a new format added to the battles for this series. If an act lost their battle, they are not immediately out of the competition. Each coach has one 'Steal' where they get the opportunity to take one losing act and have them join their team for the live shows. They do this by pressing their 'I Want You' button. 24 acts made it to the Live Shows.

Color key

Battles 1

Battles 2

Battles 3

Battles 4

The Live Shows
The Live Shows aired live on RTÉ One from The Helix in a two-hour-long show every Sunday evening from mid-March to the end of April. The 24 contestants were narrowed down to just four by public voting and the grand-final saw each remaining act release their single with a famous musician. The winner of the show received a recording contract with Universal Music and the title of 'The Voice of Ireland'.

Results summary
Color keys
Artist's info

Result details

Live show details
Color key

Live Show 1 (16 March)
Guest performer: Kian Egan ("Home")

Three artists from each team performed with one from each team being eliminated
Each coach rated each artists performance out of ten
The public vote was combined with the coaches' scores
The artist from each team with the highest combined total was sent through to the next round
Each coach sent a second artist from their own team through to the next round

Live Show 2 (23 March)
Guest performer: Keith Hanley ("Gonna Dance"), Shane Filan ("")

Three artists from each team performed with one from each team being eliminated
Each coach rated each artists performance out of ten
The public vote was combined with the coaches' scores
The artist from each team with the highest combined total was sent through to the next round
Each coach sent a second artist from their own team through to the next round

Live Show 3 (30 March)
 Matt Cardle

 Two artists from each team performed.
 One act from each team went through, with one of the four remaining acts receiving a wildcard.
 The contestant with the highest combined scored (public vote and judges) received the wildcard.
Each coach rated each artists performance out of ten
The public vote was combined with the coaches' scores
The artist from each team with the highest combined total was sent through to the next round

Live Show 4 (6 April)
 Guest performer: The Coronas

 Two artists from each team performed.
 One act from each team went through, with one of the four remaining acts receiving a wildcard.
 The contestant with the highest combined scored (public vote and judges) received the wildcard.
Each coach rated each artists performance out of ten
The public vote was combined with the coaches' scores
The artist from each team with the highest combined total was sent through to the next round

Top 10 (13 April)
 Guest performer: The Riptide Movement

Leathcheannais (20 Aibreán)
Taibheoirí:
The Riptide Movement: "All Works Out"
Original Rude Boys: "Feel It In Your Soul"

Ceannais (27 Aibreán)
Taibheoir: Clean Bandit: "Rather Be"

Ratings

References

External links
Official Site

3
2014 Irish television seasons